"I Can Hear the Grass Grow " is the second single by the Move, written by Roy Wood. The song was first released on 31 March 1967, and reached number 5 in the UK Singles Chart on 10 May 1967, staying for ten weeks in the charts. "I Can Hear the Grass Grow" was the second of a string of four consecutive top-5 singles in the UK.

Background 
On 9 December 1966, the Move released their debut single "Night of Fear" to great commercial success, reaching number 2 in the UK singles charts on 26 January 1967. The hints of psychedelia in the song led to rumours about the band using LSD or other hallucinogenic drugs, something that drummer Bev Bevan later denounced. Both rhythm guitarist Trevor Burton and bassist Ace Kefford would later admit to using drugs, the latter of which considered it a grave mistake. The newfound success led to songwriter and lead guitarist Roy Wood to believe in himself as a true songwriter, as "Night of Fear" was only the third or fourth original composition that he had written.

As with many of Wood's early songs, the basis of "I Can Hear the Grass Grow" was a book of fairy tales which Wood authored while at The Moseley College of Art. The title came from photographer Robert Davidson, who had received a letter from an unknown individual that read "I listen to pop music on the radio because where I live it's so bloody quiet that I can hear the grass grow." He told this to Wood, who was inspired enough to write a song regarding the subject. In the April 1967 Beat Instrumental issue, Wood states that the song is about a mentally ill person. Although journalists have presumed the song to be about the synesthetic effects of hallucinogenics, Wood has on multiple occasions refuted that claim, accusing the music press of trying to build an association between pop musicians and drugs, and noting that virtually any song could be misinterpreted as being about drug use by someone looking to make that connection. The group entered Advision Studios in London on 5 January 1967 to record the song, along with what eventually would become the B-side, "Wave the Flag and Stop the Train", with producer Denny Cordell and engineer Gerald Chevin.

Release and reception 
By this point, the Move had recorded approximately ten songs which were to appear on their debut album titled Move Mass in early 1967. However, their manager Tony Secunda thought it would be more commercially successful to continue performing publicity stunts in order to gain publicity for the group. "Wave the Flag and Stop the Train" was never intended as the B-side of "I Can Hear the Grass Grow", instead, an eponymous track simply titled "Move" was to take its place. However, during a mixing session on 30 January 1967 problems arose when mixing the song, which led to it being scrapped and being substituted by "Wave the Flag and Stop the Train". Deram Records released "I Can Hear the Grass Grow" on 31 March 1967 in the UK with the catalogue number of DM.117. The single was also released in territories such as the United States and Continental Europe.

The single was a success, albeit not as big as "Night of Fear". It entered the UK charts on 12 April 1967 at a position of number 39. The following week, it had climbed to number 30 and by 26 April, it was at number 16. The following week it entered the top-10 for the first time at number 7 before reaching its peak on 10 May 1967, where it stayed for one week. Following this, it started descending down the chart, at number 9 before exiting the top-10 on 24 May at a position of 13. The following week it was at number 20, and the week after that it had reached number 28. It was last seen on 14 June when it was at a position of 44 before disappearing off the charts. In total, it spent ten weeks on the charts, six of which were in the top-20 and three of which were in the top-10. It also did well in most of Europe and New Zealand.

Matthew Greenwald of AllMusic states that though the lyrics seem a little bit antique, he believes that the "artistic moxie" aged like fine wine. Unlike other songs by the Move, "I Can Hear the Grass Grow" was not dropped from the live set following the departure of Kefford, instead Burton would take over his lead vocals. It was first performed live on 3 August 1967 when they played at the Locarno Ballroom in Derby, Derbyshire. A rendition of the song was included on Live at the Fillmore 1969, which features Rick Price taking over Kefford's vocals, as Burton had left the band at that point.

Personnel 
The Move
 Carl Wayne – lead, harmony and backing vocals
 Roy Wood – lead, harmony and backing vocals, lead guitar
 Trevor Burton – harmony and backing vocals, rhythm guitar
 Chris "Ace" Kefford – lead, harmony and backing vocals, bass guitar
 Bev Bevan – harmony (chorus) vocals, drums
Additional personnel

 Denny Cordell – producer

Charts

Weekly charts

Year-end charts

All-time charts

Covers 
 In 1968, Blues Magoos recorded the song for their album, Basic Blues Magoos.
 The song was covered in 1996 by the British rock band Status Quo, but this rock version of the song was not released as a single. However, it appeared on their album, Don't Stop.
 In 2005, The Fall covered the track on their album, Fall Heads Roll.

References
Notes

References

1967 singles
The Move songs
Psychedelic songs
Songs written by Roy Wood
Song recordings produced by Denny Cordell
Deram Records singles
1967 songs
Songs about drugs